This is a list of award winners and league leaders for the Chicago Cubs professional baseball team.

Awards

World Series Most Valuable Player
 2016 – Ben Zobrist

League Championship Series Most Valuable Player
 2016 – Javier Báez & Jon Lester

Most Valuable Player
1911 – Frank Schulte
1929 – Rogers Hornsby
1935 – Gabby Hartnett
1945 – Phil Cavarretta
1952 – Hank Sauer
1958 – Ernie Banks
1959 – Ernie Banks
1984 – Ryne Sandberg
1987 – Andre Dawson
1998 – Sammy Sosa
2016 – Kris Bryant

Cy Young
1971 – Ferguson Jenkins
1979 – Bruce Sutter
1984 – Rick Sutcliffe
1992 – Greg Maddux
2015 – Jake Arrieta

Rookie of the Year
1961 – Billy Williams
1962 – Ken Hubbs
1989 – Jerome Walton
1998 – Kerry Wood
2008 – Geovany Soto
2015 – Kris Bryant

Gold Glove Award
Pitcher
Greg Maddux (1990, 1991, 1992, 2004, 2005)
Bobby Shantz (1964)
Catcher
Jody Davis (1986)
Randy Hundley (1967)
First base
Mark Grace (1992, 1993, 1995, 1996)
Derrek Lee (2005, 2007)
Anthony Rizzo (2016, 2018, 2019, 2020)
Second base
Darwin Barney (2012)
Glenn Beckert (1968)
Ken Hubbs (1962)
Ryne Sandberg (1983, 1984, 1985, 1986, 1987, 1988, 1989, 1990, 1991)
Shortstop
Javier Báez (2020)
Ernie Banks (1960)
Don Kessinger (1969, 1970)
Third base
Ron Santo (1964, 1965, 1966, 1967, 1968)
Outfield
Andre Dawson (1987, 1988)
Bob Dernier (1984)
Jason Heyward (2016, 2017)
Ian Happ (2022)

Platinum Glove Award
2016 – Anthony Rizzo

Wilson Defensive Player of the Year Award

Note: See explanatory note at Atlanta Braves award winners and league leaders.

 Team (one award for each team; all positions) (2012–2013)
Darwin Barney (2012, 2013) 

 MLB (one award for each position) (2014–present)
First baseman
Anthony Rizzo (2016)
Second baseman
none 
Shortstop
 none
Third baseman
 none
Left fielder
none
Center fielder
none
Right fielder
none
Catcher 
none
Pitcher
none

Silver Slugger Award
Pitcher
 Jake Arrieta (2016)
 Carlos Zambrano (2006, 2008, 2009)
Catcher
Michael Barrett (2005)
First baseman
Derrek Lee (2005)
Anthony Rizzo (2016)
Second baseman
Javier Báez (2018)
Ryne Sandberg (1984, 1985, 1988, 1989, 1990, 1991, 1992)
Shortstop
 none
Third baseman
 Aramis Ramírez (2011)
Outfielder
Andre Dawson (1987)
Leon Durham (1982)
Sammy Sosa (1995, 1998, 1999, 2000, 2001, 2002)

Manager of the Year
1984 – Jim Frey
1989 – Don Zimmer
2008 – Lou Pinella
2015 – Joe Maddon

Hank Aaron Award (NL)
1999 - Sammy Sosa
2008 - Aramis Ramirez
2016 - Kris Bryant

Roberto Clemente Award winners
Source:
Rick Sutcliffe – 1987
Sammy Sosa – 1998
Anthony Rizzo – 2017

MLB All Star Game Most Valuable Player
1975 - Bill Madlock*

* indicates award was shared

Major League Baseball All-Star Game Winning Pitcher
1952 - Bob Rush
1963 - Larry Jackson
1978 - Bruce Sutter
1979 - Bruce Sutter
1987 - Lee Smith

Home Run Derby Champion
1987 – Andre Dawson
1990 – Ryne Sandberg
2000 – Sammy Sosa

MLB "This Year in Baseball Awards"

Note: These awards are voted on by five groups for all of Major League Baseball (i.e., not one per league).
Note: These awards were renamed the "GIBBY Awards" (Greatness in Baseball Yearly) in 2010 and then the "Esurance MLB Awards" in 2015.

"Esurance MLB Awards" Best Starting Pitcher
 – Jake Arrieta

"Esurance MLB Awards" Best Rookie
2015 – Kris Bryant

"Esurance MLB Awards" Best Breakout Player
2015 – Jake Arrieta

"Esurance MLB Awards" Best Manager
 – Joe Maddon

"Esurance MLB Awards" Best Executive
 – Theo Epstein

National League Championship Series MVP Award
See: National League Championship Series#Most Valuable Player Award
 – Javier Baez and Jon Lester

DHL Hometown Heroes (2006)

Ernie Banks — voted by MLB fans as the most outstanding player in the history of the franchise, based on on-field performance, leadership quality and character value

Players Choice Awards NL Outstanding Player

 – Sammy Sosa

Players Choice Awards NL Outstanding Pitcher

 – Kyle Hendricks

Baseball America Rookie of the Year Award

Players Choice Awards NL Outstanding Rookie

1998 – Kerry Wood
2008 – Geovany Soto
2015 – Kris Bryant

Sporting News NL Rookie of the Year Award

 – Kris Bryant

Players Choice Awards Marvin Miller Man of the Year Award

1999 – Sammy Sosa

Sporting News Executive of the Year Award

 – Theo Epstein

Team award
 – National League pennant
1880
1881
1882
1885
1886

1907
 – World Series championship
1908
 – World Series championship
1910
1918
1929
1932
1935
1938

2016 – Warren C. Giles Trophy (National League championship)
 – Commissioner's Trophy (World Series)
2016 – Baseball America Organization of the Year
2017 (2016 Cubs) – Laureus World Sports Award for Team of the Year

Team records

League Leaders

NL Batting Champions
1876 – Ross Barnes
1880 – George Gore
1881 – Cap Anson
1884 – King Kelly
1886 – King Kelly
1888 – Cap Anson
1912 – Heinie Zimmerman
1945 – Phil Cavarretta
1972 – Billy Williams
1975 – Billy Madlock
1976 – Billy Madlock
1980 – Bill Buckner
2005 – Derrek Lee

NL Stolen Bases Champions
1897 – Bill Lange
1903 – Frank Chance
1906 – Frank Chance
1928 – Kiki Cuyler
1929 – Kiki Cuyler
1930 – Kiki Cuyler
1935 – Augie Galan
1937 – Augie Galan
1938 – Stan Hack
1939 – Stan Hack

NL Home Run Champions
1884 – Ned Williamson
1885 – Abner Dalrymple
1888 – Jimmy Ryan
1911 – Frank Schulte
1912 – Heinie Zimmerman
1916 – Cy Williams
1926 – Hack Wilson
1927 – Cy Williams
1928 – Hack Wilson
1930 – Hack Wilson
1943 – Bill Nicholson
1944 – Bill Nicholson
1958 – Ernie Banks
1960 – Ernie Banks
1979 – Dave Kingman
1987 – Andre Dawson
1990 – Ryne Sandberg
2000 – Sammy Sosa
2002 – Sammy Sosa

NL Wins Champions
1876 – Albert Spalding
1881 – Larry Corcoran
1885 – John Clarkson
1887 – John Clarkson
1890 – Bill Hutchinson
1891 – Bill Hutchinson
1892 – Bill Hutchinson
1909 – Mordecai Brown
1912 – Larry Cheney
1918 – Hippo Vaughn
1920 – Grover Cleveland Alexander
1927 – Charlie Root
1929 – Pat Malone
1932 – Lon Warneke
1938 – Bill Lee
1964 – Larry Jackson
1971 – Ferguson Jenkins
1987 – Rick Sutcliffe
1992 – Greg Maddux
2006 – Carlos Zambrano
2015 – Jake Arrieta
2018 – Jon Lester
2020 – Yu Darvish

NL Strikeout Champions
1880 – Larry Corcoran
1887 – John Clarkson
1892 – Bill Hutchinson
1906 – Fred Beebe
1909 – Orval Overall
1918 – Hippo Vaughn
1919 – Hippo Vaughn
1920 – Grover Cleveland Alexander
1929 – Pat Malone
1938 – Clay Bryant
1946 – Johnny Schmitz
1955 – Sam Jones
1956 – Sam Jones
1958 – Sam Jones
1969 – Ferguson Jenkins
2003 – Kerry Wood

Other achievements

Baseball Hall of Famers
See: Chicago Cubs#Hall of Famers

Retired numbers
See: Chicago Cubs#Retired numbers

Best Breakthrough Athlete ESPY Award

2016 – Jake Arrieta

NAB Broadcasting Hall of Fame

1994 – Harry Caray

Chicagoland Sports Hall of Fame

See also
List of MLB awards
Baseball awards#United States

References

Award
Major League Baseball team trophies and awards